The 1974 Winnipeg municipal election was held on October 23, 1974 to elect a mayor, councillors and school trustees in the city of Winnipeg.

Stephen Juba was re-elected in the mayoral contest.

Fifty councillors elected in 50 separate single-member districts.

Results

Results are taken from the Winnipeg Free Press newspaper, 24 October 1974.

Footnotes

1974 elections in Canada
Municipal elections in Winnipeg
1974 in Manitoba